Bass is an unincorporated community in Newton County, Arkansas, United States.

External links
 Newton County Historical Society

References

Unincorporated communities in Newton County, Arkansas
Unincorporated communities in Arkansas